Shokat as-Sufi is a Palestinian town in the southern Gaza Strip, south of Rafah and adjacent to the inoperable Yasser Arafat International Airport. It is one of the poorest localities in the Gaza Strip, and has underdeveloped infrastructure.

According to the Palestinian Central Bureau of Statistics (PCBS) census in 1997, Shokat as-Sufi had a population of 5,663 of which 90% were Palestinian refugees. The gender make-up of the town was 49.3% male and 50.7% female. According to the PCBS, in mid-year 2006, it had a population of 8,094. 

Shokat as-Sufi is governed by a municipal council of eleven members including the mayor, who since 2005 has been Mousa Abu Jlaidan.

References

Towns in the Gaza Strip
Municipalities of the State of Palestine